Bunawan, officially the Municipality of Bunawan,  is a 1st class municipality in the province of Agusan del Sur, Philippines. According to the 2020 census, it has a population of 47,512 people.

Bunawan was created on June 21, 1959, through Republic Act No. 2517. The world's largest crocodile, Lolong, was captured in the town in September 2011.

Geography
According to the Philippine Statistics Authority, the municipality has a land area of  constituting  of the  total area of Agusan del Sur.

Climate

Barangays
Bunawan is politically subdivided into 10 barangays.

Demographics

In the 2020 census, Bunawan had a population of 47,512.

Economy

Education

Primary and elementary

High schools
There are three high schools in the municipality.

Colleges
Bunawan has 1 college, the Agusan del Sur State College of Agriculture and Technology.

Crocodile Lolong

In early September 2011, local residents and veteran crocodile hunters caught a  saltwater crocodile weighing  in a local creek. The municipality planned to make the giant beast the centerpiece of an ecotourism park for species found in the marshlands.

On November 9, 2011, the National Geographic Team confirmed that Lolong was the world's biggest crocodile. The crocodile was transferred at the Bunawan Eco-Park and Research Center in Barangay Consuelo.

Villagers had witnessed the crocodile attack and kill a water buffalo, and they suspected it also killed a fisherman who went missing that summer. Experts from an area crocodile farm were called in to capture the wild animal, which destroyed four traps before a stronger one caught it. A hundred villagers were needed to drag the crocodile to a truck before a crane was used to put it in a truck. From there it was taken to a special cage where it was expected to be held until the ecotourism park was built around it.

The crocodile was declared dead a few hours after flipping over in a pond with a bloated stomach on February 10, 2013. The crocodile, despite being responsible for many deadly attacks, was be mourned by residents of the town, as it was the only tourist attraction that kept the town from sulking in obscurity. Its remains is preserved to allow the municipality to keep its fame.

Several other crocodiles roam the marshy areas on the outskirts of town, and villagers have been told to avoid the marshes at night.

References

External links

 [ Philippine Standard Geographic Code]
 Agusan Marsh, Bunawan

Municipalities of Agusan del Sur